Colin Philip Smith is a British Nepali lepidopterist who is widely known as "Putali Bajey" (Nepali: पुतली बाजे ) or "Butterfly Grandad" in Nepal. He has spent more than 50 years in Nepal studying and writing about its butterfly fauna. He is the author of several books on butterflies of Nepal. He visited Nepal in 1966 as a teacher under a United Mission to Nepal program. Smith has taught some of the most popular Nepali personalities such as Baburam Bhattarai and Upendra Devkota at the start of his career.

In 2019, the Nepal government granted him honorary citizenship of Nepal for his achievements as well as international reputation. He is the third person to receive the honor after Sir Edmund Hillary and Tony Hagen, and before Um Hong-gil.

References 

British lepidopterists
Honorary Citizens of Nepal
1936 births
Living people